Tenuipalpus is genus of mites in the family Tenuipalpidae, containing the following species:

 Tenuipalpus aboharensis
 Tenuipalpus abutiloni
 Tenuipalpus acaciae
 Tenuipalpus acacii
 Tenuipalpus acritus
 Tenuipalpus acuminatae
 Tenuipalpus aethiopicus
 Tenuipalpus africanus
 Tenuipalpus albae
 Tenuipalpus alpinus
 Tenuipalpus amatikulensis
 Tenuipalpus amygdalusae
 Tenuipalpus anacardii
 Tenuipalpus angolensis
 Tenuipalpus annonae
 Tenuipalpus anoplomexus
 Tenuipalpus anoplus
 Tenuipalpus antipodus
 Tenuipalpus arbuti
 Tenuipalpus argus
 Tenuipalpus ariauae
 Tenuipalpus athrixiae
 Tenuipalpus attiahi
 Tenuipalpus aurantiacus
 Tenuipalpus auriculatae
 Tenuipalpus austrocedri
 Tenuipalpus baeri
 Tenuipalpus bagdadensis
 Tenuipalpus bakerdeleonorum
 Tenuipalpus bakeri
 Tenuipalpus banahawensis
 Tenuipalpus banksiae
 Tenuipalpus barticanus
 Tenuipalpus bassiae
 Tenuipalpus bellulus
 Tenuipalpus berkheyae
 Tenuipalpus boninensis
 Tenuipalpus boyani
 Tenuipalpus bucidae
 Tenuipalpus burserae
 Tenuipalpus calcarius
 Tenuipalpus caledonicus
 Tenuipalpus capassae
 Tenuipalpus capparis
 Tenuipalpus carlosflechtmanni
 Tenuipalpus carolinensis
 Tenuipalpus caudatus
 Tenuipalpus cedrelae
 Tenuipalpus celtidis
 Tenuipalpus chamaedorea
 Tenuipalpus cheladzeae
 Tenuipalpus chelinus
 Tenuipalpus chiclorum
 Tenuipalpus chinariensis
 Tenuipalpus chiococcae
 Tenuipalpus cissampelosa
 Tenuipalpus citus
 Tenuipalpus clematidos
 Tenuipalpus coccolobicoloides
 Tenuipalpus coccolobicolus
 Tenuipalpus coimbatorensis
 Tenuipalpus comatus
 Tenuipalpus combreti
 Tenuipalpus comptus
 Tenuipalpus costarricensis
 Tenuipalpus couroupita
 Tenuipalpus coyacus
 Tenuipalpus crassulus
 Tenuipalpus crassus
 Tenuipalpus crescentiae
 Tenuipalpus crocopontensis
 Tenuipalpus cupressoides
 Tenuipalpus cyatheae
 Tenuipalpus daneshvari
 Tenuipalpus danxianensis
 Tenuipalpus dasples
 Tenuipalpus decus
 Tenuipalpus dimensus
 Tenuipalpus disparilis
 Tenuipalpus dombeyae
 Tenuipalpus dominguensis
 Tenuipalpus dubinini
 Tenuipalpus dumus
 Tenuipalpus elegans
 Tenuipalpus elongatus
 Tenuipalpus emeticae.
 Tenuipalpus engelbrechti
 Tenuipalpus ephedrae
 Tenuipalpus erasus
 Tenuipalpus eremitus
 Tenuipalpus eriophyoides
 Tenuipalpus eucleae
 Tenuipalpus eugeniae
 Tenuipalpus euonymi
 Tenuipalpus falcatus
 Tenuipalpus faresianus
 Tenuipalpus faveolus
 Tenuipalpus feliciae
 Tenuipalpus ferosus
 Tenuipalpus fici
 Tenuipalpus filicicola
 Tenuipalpus flacourtiae
 Tenuipalpus flechtmanni
 Tenuipalpus frondosus
 Tenuipalpus galpiniae
 Tenuipalpus garciniae
 Tenuipalpus gatoomensis
 Tenuipalpus geigeriae
 Tenuipalpus ghaii
 Tenuipalpus granati
 Tenuipalpus grevilleae
 Tenuipalpus guamensis
 Tenuipalpus guettardae
 Tenuipalpus gumbolimbonis
 Tenuipalpus guptai
 Tenuipalpus haripuriensis
 Tenuipalpus hastaligni
 Tenuipalpus heteropyxis
 Tenuipalpus heveae
 Tenuipalpus hondurensis
 Tenuipalpus hornotinus
 Tenuipalpus hurae
 Tenuipalpus ilocanus
 Tenuipalpus imias
 Tenuipalpus indicus
 Tenuipalpus inophylli
 Tenuipalpus insularis
 Tenuipalpus isabelae
 Tenuipalpus ixorae
 Tenuipalpus jagatkhanaens
 Tenuipalpus jamaicensis
 Tenuipalpus jandialensis
 Tenuipalpus japonicus
 Tenuipalpus jasmini
 Tenuipalpus jawadii
 Tenuipalpus jianfengensis
 Tenuipalpus jonkeri
 Tenuipalpus jordaani
 Tenuipalpus jussiaeae
 Tenuipalpus kamalii
 Tenuipalpus kapoki
 Tenuipalpus karrooi
 Tenuipalpus keiensis
 Tenuipalpus kenos
 Tenuipalpus kesari
 Tenuipalpus knorri
 Tenuipalpus kobachidzei
 Tenuipalpus kraussianae
 Tenuipalpus lalbaghensis
 Tenuipalpus laminasetae
 Tenuipalpus lanceae
 Tenuipalpus latiseta
 Tenuipalpus lawrencei
 Tenuipalpus legatus
 Tenuipalpus leipoldti
 Tenuipalpus leonorae
 Tenuipalpus leucospermi
 Tenuipalpus lineosetosus
 Tenuipalpus lucumae
 Tenuipalpus ludhianaensis
 Tenuipalpus lulinicus
 Tenuipalpus lunatus
 Tenuipalpus lustrabilis
 Tenuipalpus lycioides
 Tenuipalpus lygodii
 Tenuipalpus magalismontani
 Tenuipalpus mahoensis
 Tenuipalpus malligai
 Tenuipalpus mallotae
 Tenuipalpus mandraensis
 Tenuipalpus mansoni
 Tenuipalpus mansoniculus
 Tenuipalpus matthyssei
 Tenuipalpus melhaniae
 Tenuipalpus menglunensis
 Tenuipalpus metis
 Tenuipalpus metopii
 Tenuipalpus micheli
 Tenuipalpus microphylli
 Tenuipalpus mkuziensis
 Tenuipalpus molinai
 Tenuipalpus montanus
 Tenuipalpus mopaneae
 Tenuipalpus moraesi
 Tenuipalpus morianus
 Tenuipalpus mourerae
 Tenuipalpus muguanicus
 Tenuipalpus mustus
 Tenuipalpus myrtus
 Tenuipalpus namaensis
 Tenuipalpus nenaxi
 Tenuipalpus niekerkae
 Tenuipalpus nigerianus
 Tenuipalpus obvelatus
 Tenuipalpus oliveirai
 Tenuipalpus omani
 Tenuipalpus ombrensis
 Tenuipalpus orchidofilo
 Tenuipalpus oribiensis
 Tenuipalpus orilloi
 Tenuipalpus ortus
 Tenuipalpus ovalis
 Tenuipalpus oxalis
 Tenuipalpus pacificus
 Tenuipalpus pagesae
 Tenuipalpus pagina
 Tenuipalpus palosapis
 Tenuipalpus panici
 Tenuipalpus papiothalensis
 Tenuipalpus pareriophyiodes
 Tenuipalpus parsii
 Tenuipalpus pedrus
 Tenuipalpus pernicis
 Tenuipalpus persicae
 Tenuipalpus philippinensis
 Tenuipalpus pieteri
 Tenuipalpus pigrus
 Tenuipalpus pisinnus
 Tenuipalpus placitus
 Tenuipalpus platycaryae
 Tenuipalpus podocarpi
 Tenuipalpus populi
 Tenuipalpus portulacae
 Tenuipalpus proctori
 Tenuipalpus proteae
 Tenuipalpus protectus
 Tenuipalpus protumidus
 Tenuipalpus pruni
 Tenuipalpus prunioides
 Tenuipalpus pseudocedrelae
 Tenuipalpus punicae
 Tenuipalpus punjabensis
 Tenuipalpus pyroides
 Tenuipalpus pyrusae
 Tenuipalpus qingchengensis
 Tenuipalpus rangiorae
 Tenuipalpus raphiae
 Tenuipalpus raptor
 Tenuipalpus rarus
 Tenuipalpus reticulus
 Tenuipalpus rhagicus
 Tenuipalpus rhizophorae
 Tenuipalpus rhusi
 Tenuipalpus rhysus
 Tenuipalpus robustae
 Tenuipalpus rodionovi
 Tenuipalpus rosae
 Tenuipalpus rusapensis
 Tenuipalpus sagittus
 Tenuipalpus salicis
 Tenuipalpus sanblasensis
 Tenuipalpus sandyi
 Tenuipalpus santae
 Tenuipalpus sanyaensis
 Tenuipalpus scitulus
 Tenuipalpus sclerocaryae
 Tenuipalpus senecionis
 Tenuipalpus sharmai
 Tenuipalpus simarubae
 Tenuipalpus simplex
 Tenuipalpus simplychus
 Tenuipalpus smithi
 Tenuipalpus solanensis
 Tenuipalpus sophiae
 Tenuipalpus sparsus
 Tenuipalpus spatulatus
 Tenuipalpus stativus
 Tenuipalpus stefani
 Tenuipalpus striolatus
 Tenuipalpus tabebuiae
 Tenuipalpus taonicus
 Tenuipalpus tapirirae
 Tenuipalpus tauricus
 Tenuipalpus tectonae
 Tenuipalpus tepicanus
 Tenuipalpus terminaliae
 Tenuipalpus tetrazygiae
 Tenuipalpus toowongi
 Tenuipalpus tortulus
 Tenuipalpus transvaalensis
 Tenuipalpus trichiliae
 Tenuipalpus trifoliatae
 Tenuipalpus trisegmentus
 Tenuipalpus trisetosus
 Tenuipalpus tuttlei
 Tenuipalpus ueckermanni
 Tenuipalpus umarii
 Tenuipalpus unimerus
 Tenuipalpus unonopsonis
 Tenuipalpus uvae
 Tenuipalpus velitor
 Tenuipalpus venustus
 Tenuipalpus vernoniae
 Tenuipalpus vexus
 Tenuipalpus victoriae
 Tenuipalpus vitexi
 Tenuipalpus viticola
 Tenuipalpus vriddagiriensis
 Tenuipalpus waqasii
 Tenuipalpus xerocolus
 Tenuipalpus xylosmae
 Tenuipalpus yarensis
 Tenuipalpus yousefi
 Tenuipalpus zanthus
 Tenuipalpus zeyheri
 Tenuipalpus zhengzhouensis
 Tenuipalpus zhizhilashviliae
 Tenuipalpus zuluensis

References

External links 

Trombidiformes